The Grimes Unit  is a medium- and maximum-security state prison for men located in Newport, Jackson County, Arkansas, owned and operated by the Arkansas Department of Corrections.

The facility was opened in 1998 and has a capacity of 1,012 inmates held at medium and maximum security.

Like the adjacent McPherson Unit for female inmates, originally Grimes was managed by the Wackenhut Corrections Corp. (now GEO Group), beginning in July 1997.  In 2001, after operating both at losses, Wackenhut stated that it would not renew the contract.

References

External links
 Grimes Unit, Arkansas Department of Corrections 

Prisons in Arkansas
Buildings and structures in Jackson County, Arkansas
1998 establishments in Arkansas
Newport, Arkansas